Encarnación García Bonilla (born ) is a Spanish former volleyball player, playing as a central. She was part of the Spain women's national volleyball team.

She competed at the 2013 Women's European Volleyball Championship. On club level she played for Vóley Murcia.

References

1979 births
Living people
Spanish women's volleyball players
Place of birth missing (living people)